Vedran Matošević (born 27 August 1990) is a Croatian futsal player who plays for Nacional Zagreb and the Croatian national futsal team.

References

External links
UEFA profile

1990 births
Living people
Futsal forwards
Croatian men's futsal players